Lewis Campbell may refer to:

Lew Campbell (1831–1910), Canadian pioneer and rancher
Lewis Campbell (classicist) (1830–1908), British classical scholar
Lewis Campbell (footballer) (1864-?), Scottish footballer
Lewis B. Campbell, American CEO of Textron
Lewis D. Campbell (1811–1882), U.S. Representative from Ohio